Karmu may refer to:
 Kärmu, Estonia
 Karmu, Iran